The Hiram and Art Stamper House, at 864 Stamper Branch Rd., is a historic house near Hindman, Kentucky.  It was listed on the National Register of Historic Places in 2014.

It was a home of Kentucky Bluegrass musicians Hiram Stamper and Art Stamper.

The house on the property was a two-room log house in a saddlebag plan in 1931 when the family moved in, around 1931.

Art Stamper died in 2005 at age 71.

References

External links
Hiram Stamper: Brushy Fork of John's Creek, YouTube of fiddling

Houses on the National Register of Historic Places in Kentucky
National Register of Historic Places in Knott County, Kentucky
Log houses in the United States
Log buildings and structures on the National Register of Historic Places in Kentucky
Double pen architecture
Bluegrass music